Kabardino-Balkarian State University (KBSU);  Kabardino_Balkarskii gosudarstvennii universitet imeni H. M. Berbekova, often abbreviated КБГУ, KBSU) is a coeducational and public research university located in Nalchik, Kabardino-Balkaria, Russia. It was founded on April 5, 1957. The university is recognized by the Ministry of Science and Higher Education of the Russian Federation. It is one of the largest universities in the North Caucasus. Its current rector is Altudov Y.K. Kabardino-Balkarian State University has all the modern facilities in terms of infrastructure and education. The classroom is equipped with smart education systems and students are provided with the facility to learn virtually if they miss classes in campus. The university library is well-modernized and more than 30% of the seats are equipped with high-tech computer systems.

History

In 1924, the Lenin Training Campus (LUG) was opened in Nalchik, which was located in a building later transferred to the medical faculty. In 1925, a medical school was opened there, as well as courses for tractor drivers, an agricultural school, and a political school.

In 1931, on the basis of LUG, the Pedagogical Faculty began work. LUG reorganized into the Lenin party educational campus, which was disbanded in 1936.

On July 7, 1932, at the request of the Kabardino-Balkarian Regional Communist Party Committee, the Pedagogical Institute was opened.

On the basis of the pedagogical institute in 1957, Kabardino-Balkarian State University was formed.

In accordance with the order of the Minister of Higher and Secondary Education of the USSR V. B. Elyutin, on September 1, 1957, Kabardino-Balkarian State University began its work in 4 faculties:

 Historical and philological
 Physical and mathematical
 Civil engineering
 Agricultural

In total, there were 21 departments that trained not only school teachers, including foreign language teachers, but also civil engineers and educational agronomists.

For achievements in the training of qualified specialists and the development of scientific research, Kabardino-Balkarian State University was awarded the Order of Friendship of Peoples in 1982. On December 30, 1996, by the Decree of the President of the KBR, it was named after his first rector Khatuta Mutovich Berbekov.

KBSU is one of the leading scientific, educational, informational, social and cultural centers of the Kabardino-Balkarian Republic, and annually graduates up to two thousand specialists. In terms of equipment it occupies leading positions among other classical universities of Russia.

Faculties
 Higher School of International Education
 Institute of Architecture, Construction and Design
 Social and Humanitarian Institute
 Institute of Pedagogy, Psychology and Physical Culture and Sports Education
 
 Institute of Law, Economics and Finance
 Institute of Physics and Mathematics
 Institute of Chemistry and Biology
 Institute of Continuing Education and Professional Training in Dentistry

References

External links
 Kabardino-Balkarian State University 

Public universities and colleges in Russia